Chipola is an unincorporated community in St. Helena Parish, Louisiana, United States.

Etymology
It is speculated that the name of the community is derived from the phrase "Chi pa yo ala" which means "The stream that sinks into the earth like the setting moon" in an old dialect of the Creek language.

See also
Coleman Town, Louisiana

References

Unincorporated communities in St. Helena Parish, Louisiana
Unincorporated communities in Louisiana